The Prisoners of Shanghai is a 1927 German silent drama film directed by Géza von Bolváry and Augusto Genina and starring Carmen Boni, Jack Trevor, and Bernhard Goetzke.

Cast
Carmen Boni as Maria
Jack Trevor as Ralph Sinclair, English consul
Bernhard Goetzke as General Hai Lung
Kurt Vespermann as Teddy Knickerbocker, reporter
Agnes Petersen-Mozzuchinowa as Chinese Li
Nien Soen Ling as General's adjutant

References

External links

Films of the Weimar Republic
German drama films
German silent feature films
1927 drama films
Films directed by Géza von Bolváry
Films directed by Augusto Genina
Films set in Shanghai
German black-and-white films
Films produced by Seymour Nebenzal
Nero-Film films
Bavaria Film films
1920s German-language films
Silent drama films
1920s German films